Hamala may refer to:

 Hamala, Algeria
 Hamala, Bahrain

See also
 Hämälä